Viking Lake State Park is a  state park in Montgomery County, Iowa, United States, located near the city of Stanton.

The park's amenities include electric and non-electric campsites, six jetties for fishing, and a swimming beach. A restaurant and a boat rental facility can be found near the beach. The park also includes a  hiking trail around the lake and a shorter interpretive trail.

Much of the park is undeveloped, and a variety of wild plants can be found there. Animals that live within the park include white-tailed deer, beavers, turkeys, and ducks. The lake is a popular fishing site and is home to bluegill, largemouth bass, and redear sunfish.

References

State parks of Iowa
Protected areas of Montgomery County, Iowa